Robert Lynam may refer to:

 R. B. Lynam (born 1944), basketball player
 Robert Lynam (writer) (1796–1845), English cleric, schoolteacher, writer and editor